John Trevanion (1613–1643) was an English politician who sat in the House of Commons of England  from 1640 to 1643. He was a royalist officer who was killed in action in the English Civil War.

Trevanion was the son of Charles Trevanion  of Caerhayes in Cornwall and his wife Amia Mallet.

Trevanion was a Member of Parliament, representing the Cornish boroughs of Grampound in the Short Parliament in 1640 and Lostwithiel in the Long Parliament from 1640 until his death in action  at the siege of Bristol.

A seventeenth-century ode relating to four Cornish commanders included the distich:

They did not all fall at the same time, nor in the same place, but all four were killed in the year 1643. Slanning and Trevanion were slain at the siege of Bristol; Sir Bevil Grenville fell at the Battle of Lansdowne near Bath, where an obelisk has been erected to his memory; and Sir Sidney Godolphin was shot in the porch of the Globe lnn at Chagford in Devon.

Trevanion married Mary Arundell, youngest daughter of Royalist John Arundell of Trerice, and sister of Richard Arundell, 1st Baron Arundell of Trerice and had a son Charles, who was successor to his grandfather.

See also

Cornwall in the English Civil War

References

 

1613 births
1643 deaths
People of the English Civil War
Military personnel from Cornwall
Politicians from Cornwall
Members of the pre-1707 English Parliament for constituencies in Cornwall
English MPs 1640 (April)
English MPs 1640–1648
People killed in the English Civil War
Royalist military personnel of the English Civil War